Nip is an ethnic slur against people of Japanese descent and origin. The word Nip is an abbreviation from Nippon (日本), the Japanese name for Japan.

History
The earliest recorded occurrence of the slur seems to be in the Time magazine of 5 January 1942 where "three Nip pilots" was mentioned. The American, British, and Australian entry of the Pacific Ocean theatre of World War II heightened the use of racial slurs against the Japanese, such as Jap and Nip. The word Nip became a frequently-used slang word amongst the British Armed Forces. The 1942 Royal Air Force journal made numerous references to the Japanese as Nips, even making puns such as "there's a nip in the air" This phrase was later re-used for Hirohito's visit to the UK in 1971 by the satirical magazine Private Eye. 

As part of American wartime propaganda, caricatures and slurs (including Nip) against the Japanese diffused into entertainment, such as exemplified by the Warner Bros. cartoon Bugs Bunny Nips the Nips (1944). In General Kenney Reports: A Personal History of the Pacific War (1949), George Kenney made racial statements about the Japanese, remarking for example that "Nips are just vermin to be exterminated".

In a manner to evoke further anti-Japanese agitation, a Seattle Star editorial titled "It's Time to do Some Thinking On Nips' Return" from December 14, 1944, discussed the citizenship rights of Japanese-Americans and framed their return to American society as a problem.

On 16 November 2018, the abbreviation for the Conference on Neural Information Processing Systems was changed from NIPS to NeurIPS in large part due to its perceived connotation with the slur.

See also
 Jap

References

Anti-Japanese sentiment
Asian-American issues
Anti–East Asian slurs
Japan–United Kingdom relations
Japan–United States relations
English words